In mathematics, Kummer's conjecture is either of two the conjectures made by Ernst Eduard Kummer:
 
The Kummer–Vandiver conjecture about class numbers of cyclotomic fields
Kummer's conjecture about the Kummer sum